Isabel Vincent (born 1965 in Toronto) a Canadian investigative journalist who writes for the New York Post, is an alumna of the University of Toronto's The Varsity newspaper and the author of five books.

Early life and education 
Born in 1969 to a Portuguese Catholic family and reared in Toronto, Vincent speaks English, French, Portuguese, and Spanish. At the University of Toronto, she majored in English, wrote for the student newspaper The Gargoyle for two years, and edited The Varsity from 1988 to 1989. In 1990 she earned her BA there at University College.

Career 
In 1990s she became Latin American correspondent covering the drug wars of the Medellín Cartel. From 1991 to 1995 she was in Rio de Janeiro for Toronto's The Globe and Mail. Serving as a foreign correspondent, she covered conflicts in Kosovo for the Globe and Mail, and the war in Angola for the Nationa Post and the Globe and Mail. Since 2008 she has been an investigative reporter for New York Post, covering New York City and corruption.

Lamont/Spencer criticism

During the 1990s, Vincent wrote several articles and the book See No Evil about the Abílio dos Santos Diniz kidnapping case in Brazil. Two young Canadians, David Spencer and Christine Lamont, had been convicted of Diniz's 1989 political kidnapping and confinement and sentenced to 28 years each in Brazilian prisons. Vincent's writing was highly critical of Canadian media and their assumption that Lamont and Spencer must be innocent, attributing those assumptions to prejudices about Brazil. These writings brought Vincent open hostility from the Canadian journalism establishment.

However, David Levesque said, "She's critical of magazines like Saturday Night and CBC television's Fifth Estate, which ran stories on the case seemingly without consulting the trial transcripts available in English translations." Robert W. Shirley wrote, "...the families, lobbyists, several Canadian politicians and much of the Canadian press were unwilling to study the complexities of the case and deliberately created an international incident". He said that Vincent made an "attempt to understand how two idealistic young Canadians would have become involved in such a case. Vincent presents a wider and darker picture... Her writing is at times rushed and impacted, difficult to follow as she shifts rapidly in time and space. But her summing up of the case is masterful and she addresses some fundamental philosophical questions."

David Frum wrote,

In 1996, Lamont and Spencer admitted they had participated in the kidnappings.

For her work on the Lamont/Spencer case, Vincent received the Canadian Association of Journalists' Award for excellence in investigative journalism and a Southam Fellowship.

Kielburger libel suit 

In 1996, Vincent wrote a feature on Craig Kielburger in Saturday Night magazine saying the teenage anti-child labor advocate diverted donations made to his Free the Children charity to his family. Kielburger sued Vincent and the magazine for libel and, in February, 2000, settled for $C 319,000. The National Post editor-in-chief said settling was "largely a commercial decision... It was costing us a great deal of time and money. It was time to wind things up."

Cook sisters book
In 2021, Vincent published Two Against Hitler: The True Story of Two Courageous Sisters, a Rescue Mission in the Third Reich, and Opera, about the Cook sisters, Ida and Louise, the latter better known as romance writer Mary Burchell, who helped Jews escape Nazi-era Germany, with the possible covert assistance of the British government.

Books

See no evil: the strange case of Christine Lamont and David Spencer Reed Books Canada, 1996. 
Hitler's silent partners: Swiss banks, Nazi gold, and the pursuit of justice Toronto : A.A. Knopf Canada, 1997. . Vintage Canada, 1998. . 
 German translation: ; translated by Klaus Fritz, Norbert Juraschitz and Thomas Pfeiffer. Munich: Diana Verlag, c1997, 
 French translation: ; translated by André Dommergues and François Tétreau. Paris : L'Archipel, 1997. 
Bodies and Souls: The Trafficking of Jewish Immigrant Prostitutes in the Americas. Random House Canada, 2006. , . Details the gang Zwi Migdal in forcing women to become prostitutes.
Gilded Lily: Lily Safra, The Making of One of the World's Wealthiest Women. Harper, 2010. 
Dinner with Edward: The Story of an Unexpected Friendship (2016), . A memoir about her deep friendship with an elderly gourmand, who gives her insights into life while sharing his exquisite dinners. The movie version of this book is planned to star David Suchet, best known for his role as Hercule Poirot.

Awards 
Vincent has received multiple awards:

 Canadian Association of Journalists Award for Excellence in Investigative Journalism
 Journalism fellow at Massey College, University of Toronto. 
 National Jewish Book Award in Canada, for Bodies and Souls
 Yad Vashem Award for Holocaust History, for Hitler's Silent Partners.

References

External links 

  ( video, 56:23 minutes)
 Article at the Ryerson Review of Journalism
Isabel Vincent, NY Post archive

1965 births
Canadian women journalists
Canadian women non-fiction writers
Canadian investigative journalists
Living people
University of Toronto alumni